Wilhelm von Gottberg (born 30 March 1940) is a German politician of the Alternative for Germany.

Wilhelm von Gottberg was born in 1940, the son of Hans Heinrich von Gottberg (1900–1973) and his wife Gertrud, née Freiin von der Goltz (1908–1997). He was descended of two noble families, the Gottberg family and the Von der Goltz family. He was born in Woopen in Landkreis Bartenstein (now Poland), East Prussia. His family fled from East Prussia during World War II.

Gottberg is president of the Territorial Association of East Prussia (since 1992) and Vice President of the Federation of Expellees (since 1992) in Germany. He is also a member of the board of the Ostpreußische Kulturstiftung, and was mayor of the community of Schnega in Lower Saxony. Gottberg used to be a member of the Christian Democratic Union, but joined the Alternative for Germany in 2016.

Literature 
Jens Mecklenburg (Hrsg.): Handbuch deutscher Rechtsextremismus. Elefanten-Press, Berlin 1996, ISBN 3-88520-585-8, S. 462–463.

References

External links
 Landsmannschaft Ostpreußen - Biography
Der Holocaust – "Mythos", "Dogma", "jüdische 'Wahrheit'"

1940 births
Living people
People from Kaliningrad Oblast
People from East Prussia
Christian Democratic Union of Germany politicians
Members of the Bundestag for Lower Saxony
Mayors of places in Lower Saxony
Members of the Bundestag 2017–2021
Members of the Bundestag for the Alternative for Germany